Season 3 of So You Think You Can Dance Canada is a dance reality show and competition that airs on CTV.  It is hosted by ETalk correspondent Leah Miller. In addition to the winner receiving the title of Canada's Favourite Dancer and $100,000, both the winner and runner-up received a Mazda 2.

Auditions 

Open auditions for this season were held in the following locations, with one guest judge joining Jean-Marc, Tré, and Luther at the Judges' Table:

Finals Week 
Judges: Jean-Marc Généreux, Tré Armstrong, Blake McGrath, Luther Brown, Mary Murphy, Sean Cheesman, France Mousseau, Rex Harrington

Contestants

Elimination chart

Women

Men

Finals

Performances

Week 1 (August 23, 2010)
Judges: Jean-Marc Généreux, Tré Armstrong, Blake McGrath, Luther Brown, Mary Murphy

 Due to an injury, Shelania Anderson withdrew and was replaced for the evening by the previous season's champion, Tara-Jean Popowich.

Week 2 (August 30, 2010)
Judges: Jean-Marc Généreux, Tré Armstrong, Luther Brown, Mia Michaels

Week 3 (September 6, 2010)
Judges: Jean-Marc Généreux, Tré Armstrong, Blake McGrath, Melissa Williams

Week 4 (September 13, 2010)
Judges: Jean-Marc Généreux, Tré Armstrong, Rex Harrington, Stacey Tookey

Week 5 (September 22, 2010)
Judges: Jean-Marc Généreux, Tré Armstrong, Mia Michaels, Sean Cheesman
 Beginning at week 5, the contestants select another partner to dance with.

Week 6 (September 29, 2010)
Judges: Jean-Marc Généreux, Tré Armstrong, Blake McGrath, Luther Brown, Mary Murphy

Week 7 (October 6, 2010)
Judges: Jean-Marc Généreux, Tré Armstrong, Dan Karaty, Karen Kain

Solos:

Week 8 (October 13, 2010)
Group dance: "History Repeating"—Propellerheads feat. Shirley Bassey (Jazz; Choreographer: Sean Cheesman)
Judges: Jean-Marc Généreux, Tré Armstrong, Sergio Trujillo, Rex Harrington

Solos:

Week 9 (October 20, 2010)
Group dance: "Undone" (With the Hagerman Quartet)"—DeVotchKa (Contemporary; Choreographer: Stacey Tookey)

Solos:

Result shows

Week 1 (August 24, 2010)
Group dance: Top 21: "Zombie" from Fela! (Theater; Choreographer: Bill T. Jones)
Solos:

New partners:
None

Week 2 (August 31, 2010)
Group dance: Top 20: "Jai Ho" from Slumdog Millionaire (Bollywood; Choreographer: Longinus Fernandes)
Solos:

New partners:
Claudia Primeau
Edgar Gilbert-Reyes

Week 3 (September 7, 2010)
Group dance: Top 18: "Let Go"—Mitzi Gaynor (Jazz; Choreographer: Mia Michaels)
Solos:

New partners:
Kirsten Wicklund
Jesse Weafer

Week 4 (September 14, 2010)
Group dance: Top 16: "Sing Sing Sing Part 1 (81neutronz and Sergio Trujillo remix)—Louis Prima (Theater; Choreographer: Sergio Trujillo)
Solos:

New partners:
None

Week 5 (September 23, 2010)
Group dance: Top 14: "Hello Good Morning"— Diddy-Dirty Money (Hip-hop; Choreographer: Luther Brown)
Solos:

Week 6 (September 30, 2010)
Group dance: Top 12: "Will I?" from Rent (Contemporary; Choreographer: Mia Michaels)
Solos:

Week 7 (October 7, 2010)
Group dance: Top 10: "Troglodyte (Cave Man)"—Jimmy Castor Bunch/"Disco Inferno"—The Trammps (Disco; Choreographer: Maria Torres)
Solos:

Week 8 (October 14, 2010)
Group dance: Top 8: "Take It Off"—Kesha (Cha-cha-cha; Choreographers: Jean-Marc Généreux and France Mousseau)
Solos:

Week 9 (October 24, 2010)
Judges: Jean-Marc Généreux, Tré Armstrong, Blake McGrath, Luther Brown, Sergio Trujillo, Rex Harrington, Mary Murphy, Mia Michaels
Group Dances:
Top 21: "Flashdance What A Feeling"—DJ. BoBo ft. Irene Cara(Theatre; Choreographer: Sergio Trujillo)
Top 21: "Zombie" from Fela! (Theatre; Choreographer: Bill T. Jones)
Top 12: "Will I?" from Rent (Contemporary; Choreographer: Mia Michaels)
Top 10: "Under Pressure"—Queen (Jazz; Choreographer: Melissa Williams)
Top 4: "Relax"—Blake McGrath (Jazz; Choreographer: Mia Michaels)
Special Performance:
Justin Jackson: "Knockin"—Ledisi
Judges' Picks

Eliminated:
Janick Arseneau
Jeff Mortensen

Runner-up:
Amanda Cleghorn

WINNER:
Denys Drozduyk

External links
 So You Think You Can Dance Canada

2010 Canadian television seasons
Season 03